The Ohio State University Crew is the rowing club of Ohio State University, located in Columbus, Ohio, in the United States.  It was founded in 1978.  Open to both men and women, it is an official university club sport.

General
The team's boathouse, provided by the university, is located on the Olentangy River in the basement of the Drake Performance & Event Center. Team members practice on the Scioto Mile in downtown Columbus, OH.

Competition
The club competes against crews from around the country, including both club teams and varsity programs.  The club is a founding member of the American Collegiate Rowing Association, and competes in the ACRA national championship regatta on a yearly basis.

All Competitions
Ohio State Crew Club Schedule

Leadership
The team is led by an experienced group of coaches selected by the leadership of the team. Captains are elected to contribute to the day-to-day operation of the team. On the administrative side of the team, a corps of officers are elected on a yearly basis to lead the team. These officers also nominate directors, to whom they can delegate various responsibilities contributing to the smooth running of the club.

Coaches

Captains

Officers

References

Crew Club